Jennifer A. Senko born June 23, 1954 is an American documentary filmmaker and author. She is known for her work on the documentary films The Vanishing City, and The Brainwashing of My Dad.

Life and career
Senko graduated on the Dean's List from Pratt Institute, where she studied communications design and painting. In 2000, she directed her documentary short, Road Map Warrior Women. It was a road trip documentary about extraordinarily independent women in the West. In 2010, she co-directed the feature documentary, The Vanishing City, along with Fiore DeRosa, about gentrification's dire consequences in New York City and in other major cities around the world.

Senko directed The Brainwashing of My Dad about her father's radical transformation from a non-political Democrat to an extremely political Republican after he discovered talk radio on a long commute to work, which was released in 2016.

Filmography

Publications 
 2021 – The Brainwashing of My Dad

Awards and nominations

References

External links
 

1954 births
Living people
American documentary film directors
American documentary film producers
American women documentary filmmakers